Ockert is a given name and surname that may refer to
Given name
Ockert Cilliers (born 1981), South African sprinter
Ockert Erasmus (born 1988), South African cricketer
Ockert van Greunen (1933–1987), South African modern pentathlete

Surname
Darren Ockert, English pop singer, songwriter and producer